Placocharis are a genus of very large, air-breathing land snails, terrestrial pulmonate gastropod molluscs in the subfamily Placostylinae  of the family Bothriembryontidae.

Species
 Placocharis acutus Clench, 1935
 Placocharis founaki (Hombron & Jacquinot, 1847)
 Placocharis guppyi (E. A. Smith, 1892)
 Placocharis kreftii (Cox, 1872)
 Placocharis macfarlandi (Brazier, 1876)
 Placocharis macgillivrayi (L. Pfeiffer, 1855)
 Placocharis malaitensis (Clench, 1941)
 Placocharis manni (Clapp, 1923)
 Placocharis ophir (Clench, 1941)
 Placocharis palmarum (Mousson, 1869)
 Placocharis paravicinianus (B. Rensch, 1934)
 Placocharis strangei (L. Pfeiffer, 1855)
 Placocharis stutchburyi (L. Pfeiffer, 1860)

References

 Neubert, E., Chérel-Mora C. & Bouchet P. (2009). Polytypy, clines, and fragmentation: The bulimes of New Caledonia revisited (Pulmonata, Orthalicoidea, Placostylidae). In P. Grancolas (ed.), Zoologia Neocaledonica 7. Biodiversity studies in New Caledonia. Mémoires du Muséum National d'Histoire Naturelle. 198: 37-131
 Delsaerdt, A., 2010 Land snails on the Solomon Islands. Volume 1. Placostylidae

External links
 Pilsbry, H. A. (1900). Manual of conchology, structural and systematic, with illustrations of the species. Ser. 2, Pulmonata. Vol. 13: Australasian Bulimulidae: Bothriembryon, Placostylus. Helicidae: Amphidromus. pp 1-253, pls 1-72. Philadelphia, published by the Conchological Section, Academy of Natural Sciences.
 Clench, W. J. (1935). A new subgenus and a new species of Placostylus from the Solomon Islands. Nautilus. 48(4): 126

 
Gastropod genera
 Clench, W. J. (1941). The land Mollusca of the Solomon Islands (Succineidae, Bulimulidae and Partulidae). American Museum Novitates. 1129: 1-21